Düwag or Duewag, formerly Waggonfabrik Uerdingen, was a German manufacturer of rail vehicles. It was sold in 1999 to Siemens with the brand later retired.

History 
Duewag was founded in March 1898 as Waggonfabrik Uerdingen in Uerdingen and produced rail vehicles under the Düwag brand. After merging with Düsseldorfer Waggonfabrik in 1935, railway vehicles were built in Uerdingen, while the Düsseldorf plant produced mainly local traffic vehicles, namely tramway and light rail vehicles. In 1981, the company changed its name from Waggonfabrik Uerdingen to Duewag.

Siemens acquired a 60% shareholding in 1989 before taking full ownership in April 1999. In 2001, the Düsseldorf plant was closed with production transferred to Uerdingen.

Duewag vehicles were close to a monopoly market in West Germany, as nearly every tram and light rail vehicle purchased from the 1960s onward was built by Duewag.

Products 
Uerdingen railbus
Buffel (DM'90)
GT8 tramcar in various versions
GT6 tramcar in various versions
GB6 tramcar
GT12 tramcar
TW 400
TW 6000
Stadtbahnwagen B
SL79
Y-trains Delivered about 100 trains, to local railways in Denmark, between years : 1965-1983
DSB Class MR/MRD DMUs
Hong Kong Light Rail Phase 1 (Comeng), Phase 2 (Kawasaki) and Phase 3 (A Goninan) bogies
RegioSprinter
Siemens-Duewag U2
Siemens-Duewag Supertram
Toll Royal Railways ZZ800 DMU

References

External links

Company website
Collection of photos of Duewag manufactured Trams

 
Siemens
Vehicle manufacturing companies established in 1898
Krefeld
Vehicle manufacturers of Germany
German companies established in 1898
Tram vehicles of Norway